Vrbovec is a municipality and village in Znojmo District in the South Moravian Region of the Czech Republic. It has about 1,200 inhabitants.

Administrative parts
The village of Hnízdo is an administrative part of Vrbovec.

References

Villages in Znojmo District